The Rock is a boulder on the campus of Michigan State University. Once popular as a trysting site, today it serves as a billboard for campus groups and events. 

History

The Rock was unearthed in 1873 near what is now the corner of Grand River Avenue (M-43) and Michigan Avenue in East Lansing, Michigan. It was donated to the (Michigan) State Agricultural College by the class of 1873. The college placed the rock in the "Sacred Space" near the modern day Beaumont Tower, where the stone became a common hangout for young couples and became known as the "Engagement Rock". By the late 20th century, the rock had become better known for protest slogans than engagement photos. In 1985, it was moved to its current location, east of Farm Lane, on the north bank of the Red Cedar River. Today, the innumerable layers of paint obliterate the original inscription: "Class '73".

Modern use

The Rock can be painted on by anyone and is used for anything from birthday wishes and marriage proposals to political statements. The Rock is also a hot spot for rival universities to paint. As a result, during football and basketball season MSU students often camp next to the Rock to protect it.

One of the most poignant moments in the history of the Rock occurred on the evening of September 11, 2001. Within hours of the September 11 attacks, virtually every activist group on campus, along with the university administration, had organized an impromptu candlelight vigil at the floodplain next to the Rock. The Rock was painted green and white with the words "MSU students in remembrance and reflection" on the front, and an American flag on the back. Several thousand students attended. In a break from normal rock-painting etiquette, the university asked all campus groups to abstain from repainting the Rock for one week.

On Wednesday, April 9, 2014, at 9:00 pm, hundreds gathered at the rock to hold a vigil for Lacey Holsworth, dubbed "Princess Lacey", a young 8-year-old girl with terminal cancer who befriended the MSU Basketball team. A movement, highlighted by an article in the Detroit News, sought to ban all future painting of the rock and to preserve it as a permanent memorial to Lacey. By April 21, 2014, four days after her memorial, it was repainted with the message "Congratulations graduates, be a hero to someone" marking the longest period in recent history that the rock had gone unchanged.

Shortly after the MSU mass shooting that killed three students and injured five others, on February 13, 2023, the rock was painted black with the text "How many more?" in red paint and "Stay Safe MSU" below in white paint. On February 15, the message had been painted over to show a message apparently supporting gun rights stating; "Allow us to defend ourselves & carry on campus." The message was replaced the same day with a memorial to the three deceased victims and those affected, "To those we lost / to those healing" with the deceased victims first names included in the message. The Rock was painted a third time that day by Detroit-based artist Anthony Lee at the university's request. Lee's artwork included the Spartan logo and the message "Always a Spartan. Brian. Arielle. Alexandria."

References

Michigan State University campus
Stone objects
1873 establishments in Michigan